"Open the Door" is a 1996 single by Magnapop released by Play It Again Sam Records as a CD maxi-single, two-track CD  and 7" on red viny . A promotional CD and 10" were released by Priority Records. Live recordings of the song appear on the German edition of 2005's Mouthfeel and the live album Magnapop Live at Maxwell's 03/09/2005. A music video was created for the song in 1996.

The song chronicle's songwriters Linda Hopper and Ruthie Morris's struggle with the deaths of mutual acquaintances. The music video for the song was censored by MTV for its depiction of drug abuse.

Track listing
All songs written by Linda Hopper and Ruthie Morris

CD
"Open the Door" – 3:38
"True Love" – 1:56
"Re-Hab" – 2:37

7"
"Open the Door" – 3:38
"Re-Hab" – 2:37

Promotional CD and 10"
"Open the Door" (Edit) – 3:20
"Open the Door" – 3:36

Personnel

Magnapop
Linda Hopper – lead vocals
Ruthie Morris – lead guitar, backing vocals
Shannon Mulvaney – bass guitar

Additional personnel
Josh Freese – drums
Geza X – production, engineering
Eddie Shryer of Future Disc – mastering
Thom Wilson – audio mixing

Reception
The single spent nine weeks on the charts, peaking on June 22, 1996, at 28.

In 2003, alternative weekly Creative Loafing listed "Open the Door" amongst their "Welcome to Atlanta" mixtape of Atlanta-based artists.

Cover versions
The song has been covered by Eels for the single "Flyswatter"—it would later be collected on Useless Trinkets: B-Sides, Soundtracks, Rarities and Unreleased 1996–2006. They performed the song several times on their Electro-Shock Blues Show tour in support of Electro-Shock Blues. Karaoke versions of the song were released by Stingray Digital through the iTunes Store on January 15, 2008.

Eels personnel
Butch – drums, percussion
E – lead vocals, guitar
Adam Siegel – backing vocals, bass guitar

References

External links

1996 singles
Eels (band) songs
Magnapop songs
Songs about suicide
Song recordings produced by Geza X
Songs written by Ruthie Morris
Songs written by Linda Hopper
PIAS Recordings singles
1996 songs